Charleston Light, also known as Sullivan's Island Lighthouse, is located on Sullivan's Island, South Carolina, which is the northern entrance to Charleston Harbor. The lighthouse was erected to replace the defunct Morris Island Light on Morris Island, which was at risk of being destroyed by erosion, but remains standing and was stabilized in 2010. Construction was started in 1960, and it was first lit on June 15, 1962.

Charleston Light has a steel frame, an aluminum alloy skin, and a triangular cross section. Originally, it was painted white and red-orange, but was later repainted white and black after citizens complained about the distracting color of the upper half. It is the only U.S. lighthouse with an elevator and air conditioning, and was the last onshore manned lighthouse to be built by the Federal Government. The Texas Tower Offshore Lighthouses were the last offshore manned lighthouses and, were built later starting in 1961 with Buzzards Bay Entrance Light.

It has a DCB 24 light. It originally had 28 million candelas (candlepower) and was the second most powerful in the Western Hemisphere. Its characteristic is two 0.2 s flashes separated by 4.8 s every 30 s. The light was automated in 1975.

It is a non-contributing resource located in the U.S. Coast Guard Historic District. Now part of Fort Sumter and Fort Moultrie National Historical Park. Although it was donated by the Coast Guard to the National Park System in 2007, the Coast Guard continues to maintain the light of the lighthouse, while the National Park System protects its historical significance and overall physical upkeep.

Although this lighthouse is still a working light, many problems within its structure keeps it from being open to the public. Currently it is fenced off from civilians, but visitors are able to explore the surrounding grounds, as well as the adjacent public beach access, in order to view the lighthouse.

Images

References

External links
 
Lighthousefriends - Charleston Light page
NPS Inventory of Historic Light Stations - Charleston Light

Lighthouses in South Carolina
Buildings and structures in Charleston County, South Carolina
Lighthouses completed in 1962